L'Amour (1973), also known as Andy Warhol's L'Amour, is an underground film written by Paul Morrissey and Andy Warhol and directed by Morrissey and Warhol. The film, released on May 10, 1973, stars Donna Jordan, Michael Sklar, Jane Forth, Max Delys, Patti D'Arbanville, and Karl Lagerfeld. A farcical comedy meant to be campy and raunchy, the film was panned by critics, accused of being too subdued to stand on its own alongside more over-the-top films like John Waters’ Pink Flamingos (1972), which was released within the same year.

The lyrics to the opening theme were written by Skylar, with vocals being provided by Cass Elliot from The Mamas and the Papas.

Plot
All actors in the film share a name with their fictional counterparts.

American hippies Donna and Jane’s friend Patti comes to visit, having clearly done very financially well for herself. She recommends if the two girls want to be wealthy and glamorous as well they should find rich husbands, and a plan is concocted for them to move to Paris to become models and seduce suitably wealthy men.

Jane and Donna are introduced to housemates Michael and Max, the millionaire son of a urinal cake tycoon and a sex worker respectively. These two have their own agendas: Michael, a gay man, wants to get a wife to placate his family, and to have someone to adopt the true object of his affections, Max, with. Max, while happy to have a luxurious home to live in, feels lonely under Michael’s overbearing control and finds himself enamored with the ditzy Jane.

Michael and Donna come to an agreement: if he can get her on the cover of Vogue, she’ll marry him. The quartet get up to fun all over Paris, taking product photographs of urinal cakes next to pissiors and roller skating around the park.

The relationships between the four are starting to change, though rarely in the ways any of them intended. Max becomes more frustrated with Michael’s jealous, controlling nature, and Michael puts Max down for being an impoverished sex worker whenever Max stands up for himself, saying if Michael hadn’t taken pity on him Max would have nothing. Max is enjoying a fling with Jane, who enjoys listing her favorite genres of American cable television during sex. Donna eventually realizes after an extremely unsuccessful attempt to sleep with Michael that he’s obviously avoiding being physical with her, and so gives up the act and joins him in eating snacks in bed.

Things come to a boiling point when, after a falling out, Michael overhears Max saying to Jane that he hates Michael and now only wants to be adopted so he and Jane can inherit his fortune when he dies. Michael confronts him and Max leaves his house for good.

Max and Jane say their goodbyes in front of the Eiffel Tower, Max vowing to make his own living on the Parisian streets and Jane announcing that she’s returning to New York City. The final scene reveals Michael and Donna eating in a Parisian cafe, Donna holding a copy of Vogue that shows she is indeed on the cover. Outside Max converses with a client. As the two men run off together, Michael sees them and tries regretfully to follow, ultimately left to walk the Paris streets with only Donna for companionship.

See also
 Andy Warhol filmography

References

External links
 
 

1973 films
Films directed by Paul Morrissey
Films directed by Andy Warhol
1970s American films